Ogyris olane, the Olane azure, is a butterfly in the family Lycaenidae. It is found in Australia, where it is found in most of the eastern half, including Queensland, New South Wales, Victoria and South Australia.

Adults of both sexes are purple with broad black wing margins. The underside of the forewings is dark brown with white lines. The hindwings have a complex brown pattern.

The larvae feed on Loranthaceae species, including Amyena miquelii and Amyema pendulum. They are pinkish brown with dark markings. The larvae are attended by various species of ants. Pupation takes place in a crevice near the food plant.

Subspecies
 Ogyris olane olane (inland southern Queensland to South Australia)
 Ogyris olane ocela Waterhouse, 1934 (southern Queensland to coastal Victoria)

References

Butterflies described in 1862
Arhopalini